Olszewo  is a village in the administrative district of Gmina Jeżów, within Brzeziny County, Łódź Voivodeship, in central Poland.

The village has a population of 70.

References

Villages in Brzeziny County